Epermenia falcata is a moth in the family Epermeniidae. It was described by Reinhard Gaedike in 2008. It is found in North America, where it has been recorded from the state of Washington.

References

Epermeniidae
Moths described in 2008
Moths of North America